Royal Noble Consort Hwa of the Namwon Yun clan (Hangul: 화빈 남원 윤씨, Hanja: 和嬪 南原 尹氏; 11 April 1765 – 14 January 1824) was a concubine of King Jeongjo of Joseon.

Biography

Early life 
Lady Yun was born into the Namwon Yun clan, on April 11, 1765. She was the only child of Yun Chang-yun and his wife, Lady Yi of the Beokjin Yi clan.

Life as royal concubine 
On February 21, 1780, Queen Dowager Yesun announced the selection for a new concubine for her step-grandson, King Jeongjo, because his primary wife, Queen Hyoui, couldn't bear any children and his first concubine, Lady Hong Won-bin, died one year prior. The selection took place from 30 February until 9 March.

On March 10, 1780, when she was 15 years old, Lady Yun became a concubine of the Bin rank, with the prefix "Hwa" (和), meaning "peace/harmony". She was   alternatively known as Lady Gyeongsu (경수궁, 慶壽宮).

Lady Hwa-bin died without issue, on September 14, 1824 (the 24th year of King Sunjo's reign). She was buried in Goyang, Gyeonggi Province.

Family 
 Father: Yun Chang-yun (윤창윤, 尹昌胤)
 Mother: Lady Yi of the Beokjin Yi clan (벽진 이씨, 碧珍 李氏)
 Grandfather: Yi Hun-bo (이훈보)
 Husband
 Yi San, King Jeongjo of Joseon (이산 조선 정조, 李祘 朝鮮 正祖) (28 October 1752 – 18 August 1800) — No issue.

Legacy
White porcelain blue flower (백자청화 칠보화훼문 사각병) – Seoul Tangible Cultural Property No. 402.
A book which was written by Lady Yun about setting the etiquette rules to be followed in Gyeongsu Palace (경수궁, 慶壽宮).

In popular culture
Portrayed by Yoo Yeon-ji in the 2007 MBC TV series Lee San, Wind of the Palace.
Portrayed by Yi Seo in the 2021 MBC TV series The Red Sleeve.

References

External links
Royal Consort Hwa on Doosan Encyclopedia .
Royal Consort Hwa on 한국역대인물 종합정보시스템 .

1765 births
1824 deaths
18th-century Korean people
18th-century Korean women
Royal consorts of the Joseon dynasty
19th-century Korean women
19th-century Korean people